Anatoli Alekseyevich Zinchenko (born 8 August 1949, in Stalinsk) is a retired Soviet football player and Russian coach. He is best known for being the first Soviet football player to play for a Western European professional club. His transfer to SK Rapid Wien was initiated by Austrian communist journalist Kurt Chastka. Because Soviet footballers were officially amateurs, he was formally employed as an equipment technician at the Soviet embassy while playing for Rapid, while his Rapid salary was sent over to the Soviet government.

International career
Zinchenko made his debut for USSR on 24 September 1969 in a friendly against Yugoslavia. He was capped three times in total.

Honours
 Soviet Cup finalist: 1969, 1971
 Austrian Football Bundesliga winner: 1982, 1983
 Austrian Cup winner: 1983

References

External links
 Profile 

1949 births
Living people
Russian people of Ukrainian descent
Soviet footballers
Soviet Union international footballers
Soviet expatriate footballers
Expatriate footballers in Austria
FC Rotor Volgograd players
FC SKA Rostov-on-Don players
FC Zenit Saint Petersburg players
FC Dynamo Saint Petersburg players
SK Rapid Wien players
Austrian Football Bundesliga players
Soviet football managers
Russian football managers
FC Dynamo Saint Petersburg managers
Association football forwards
People from Novokuznetsk
Sportspeople from Kemerovo Oblast